The Last New Yorker is a 2007 American drama film directed by Harvey Wang and starring Dominic Chianese and Dick Latessa.

Plot

Cast
Dominic Chianese as Lenny Sugarman
Dick Latessa as Ruben
Kathleen Chalfant as Mimi
Josh Hamilton as Zach
Joe Grifasi as Jerry
Ben Hammer as Moses Weiss
Sylvia Kauders as Miriam Weiss
Gerry Vichi as Lou Fishman

Reception
The film has a 40% rating on Rotten Tomatoes.  Christian Blauvelt of Slant Magazine awarded the film one and a half stars out of four.

References

External links
 
 

American drama films
Films set in New York (state)
Films set in New York City
2007 films
2007 drama films
2000s English-language films
2000s American films